The 2014 Girls' Youth NORCECA Volleyball Championship was the nine edition of the bi-annual women's volleyball tournament, played by nine countries from July 8–13, 2014 in Guatemala, Guatemala. USA and Cuba qualified to the 2015 Women's Junior World Championship.

Competing Nations

Pool standing procedure
Match won 3–0: 5 points for the winner, 0 point for the loser
Match won 3–1: 4 points for the winner, 1 points for the loser
Match won 3–2: 3 points for the winner, 2 points for the loser
In case of tie, the teams were classified according to the following criteria:
points ratio and sets ratio

First round

Pool A

Pool B

Pool C

Final round

Championship bracket

Classification 9

Quarterfinals

Classification 7-8

Semifinals

Classification 5-6

Classification 3-4

Final

Final standing

All-Star Team

Most Valuable Player

Best Setter

Best Opposite

Best Outside Hitters

Best Middle Blockers

Best Libero

External links
 NORCECA

International volleyball competitions hosted by Guatemala
Women's NORCECA Volleyball Championship
2014 in volleyball
2014 in Guatemalan sport